Ocourt is a village and former municipality in the district of Porrentruy of the canton of Jura in Switzerland.
Since January 1, 2009 it is a part of the new municipality Clos du Doubs.

References

Former municipalities of the canton of Jura
Clos du Doubs